George Mann is a British author and editor, primarily in genre fiction, and is best known for his alternate history detective novel series Newbury and Hobbes (2008-2019) and The Ghosts action science fiction noir novels (2010-2017), a book series set in the same universe.

Mann works in Nottinghamshire and lives in Lincolnshire, England. He is a former editor of Outland Magazine, and has also edited a number of anthologies including The Solaris Book of New Science Fiction (Volumes 1, 2 and 3), The Solaris Book of New Fantasy and two retrospective collections of Sexton Blake stories, Sexton Blake, Detective, which has an introduction by Michael Moorcock and Sexton Blake, Crime Fighter.

Mann is the author of The Human Abstract, The Severed Man, a novella in the series the Time Hunter, and co-author of the series finale, Child of Time. He has also written numerous short stories, and original Doctor Who novels. In 2011 he wrote a new Sherlock Holmes audiobook as well. The novels The Affinity Bridge and The Osiris Ritual marked the beginning of his Newbury and Hobbes detective series.

Newbury and Hobbes novel series
Mann has published four novels and several stories subtitled A Newbury & Hobbes or A Maurice Newbury investigation. These are steampunk adventures, set in Victorian England, featuring Sir Maurice Newbury, a gentleman "investigator for the Crown" (reminiscent of Mycroft Holmes), and his assistant Miss Veronica Hobbes who, unbeknownst to him, is an agent of the Queen as well. This is an ongoing series that will consist of at least six novels.

In November 2012, Obverse Books released a Newbury and Hobbes Annual, with contents modelled on the World Distributor Annuals which were popular in the UK in the 70s and 80s.  The Annual contains new stories, a boardgame, crossword and a comic strip, in the same manner as those earlier annuals.

The Ghosts novel series

Although not part of the Newbury & Hobbes franchise, Mann continued to expand upon its setting with the novel Ghosts of Manhattan and its sequels, Ghosts of War, Ghosts of Karnak, and Ghosts of Empire. Set twenty-five years after Newbury & Hobbes, the stories follow a new cast of characters, initially taking place in New York City in an alternate history version of the Roaring Twenties. Ghosts embraces a Decopunk aesthetic, depicting anachronistic coal-powered future technology and pulp heroes battling eldritch horrors and the occult in the shadows of 1920s Manhattan and beyond. Mann has dubbed this series The Ghosts after one of its lead protagonists, Gabriel Cross, a broken World War One veteran-turned-vigilante who assumes an alter ego called The Ghost and battles organized crime corrupted by supernatural forces, while struggling with the horrors of his own past.

On 15 October 2020 Legion M announced they were developing an adult animated television series with Powerhouse Animation based on The Ghosts novels, with Aaron Waltke attached as showrunner and Michael Uslan as executive producer of the project.

Bibliography

Novels

 The Human Abstract (Telos, 2004)
 Sherlock Holmes: The Will of the Dead ( (Titan Books, 2013)
 Sherlock Holmes: The Spirit Box (Titan Books, 2014)
 Wychwood (2017): a legend of occult practices in the ancient forest of Wychwood is the basis for a modern crime story.

Doctor Who
 Paradox Lost (BBCbooks, 2011)
 Engines of War (BBCbooks, 2014)

The Ghosts series
 Ghosts of Manhattan (Pyr, 2010)
 Ghosts of War  (Pyr, 2011)
 Ghosts of Karnak (Titan Books, 2016)
 Ghosts of Empire (Titan Books, 2017)

Newbury & Hobbes series
 The Affinity Bridge (Snowbooks, 2008)
 "The Hambleton Affair" (Newbury and Hobbes short story) – appeared in the hardcover edition of The Affinity Bridge, free PDF available for download. Included in The Casebook of Newbury & Hobbes.
 "The Shattered Teacup" (Snowbooks, 2010) (free PDF eBook/Audiobook download)*  Included in The Casebook of Newbury & Hobbes.
 The Osiris Ritual (Snowbooks, 2009)
 "What Lies Beneath" (short story), free PDF available for download  Included in The Casebook of Newbury & Hobbes.
 The Immorality Engine (Snowbooks, 2011)
 The Executioner's Heart (Titan Books, 2013)
 The Revenant Express (Titan Books, 2019)
 The Casebook of Newbury & Hobbes Collection (Titan Books, 2013)
 The Albion Initiative (ISBN 9781250852366) (Tor Books, 2022)

Graphic Novels

Dark Souls
 The Breath of Andolus (Titan Books, 2016)
 Legends of the Flame (Titan Books, 2017)
 Winter's Spite (Titan Books, 2017)

Doctor Who
 The Lost Dimension (Titan Books, 2017)
 Supremacy of the Cybermen (Titan Books, 2016)
 Ghost Stories (Titan Books, 2017)
 The Eighth Doctor: A Matter of Life and Death (Titan Books, 2017)
 The Eleventh Doctor: The Sapling Vol. 2: Roots (Titan Books, 2017)
 The Twelfth Doctor: Hyperion (Titan Books, 2016)
 The Twelfth Doctor: The Terror Beneath (Titan Books, 2017)
 The Twelfth Doctor: The Twist (Titan Books, 2017)

Warhammer 40,000
 Will of Iron (Titan Books, 2016)
 Revelations (Titan Books, 2017)
 The Fallen (Titan Books, 2018)

Novellas
Time Hunter series
 The Severed Man (Telos, 2004)
 Child of Time(Telos, 2007) (with David J Howe)

'''Judges series Lone Wolf (January 2019)

Short stories

 "Methuselah" in Short Trips: Transmissions (Big Finish, 2008)
 "The Hambleton Affair" (Newbury and Hobbes short story) (Snowbooks, 2008; appeared in the hardcover edition of The Affinity Bridge]
 "The Shattered Teacup" (Newbury and Hobbes short story) (Snowbooks, 2010)
 "The Cull" in The Obverse Book of Ghosts (Obverse Books, 2010)
 "Annabel Regina" in Iris: Abroad (Obverse Books, 2010)
 "Rise and Fall" in Short Trips: Volume 1 (Big Finish, 2010)
 "The Albino's Shadow" in Zenith Lives! (Obverse Books, 2011)

Short story collections

 The Sacrificial Pawn and Other Stories (Obverse Books, 2011)
 The Newbury & Hobbes Annual 2013 (Obverse Books, 2012)
 The Casebook of Newbury & Hobbes (Titan Books, 2013)

Non fiction

 The Mammoth Encyclopedia of Science Fiction (2001)
 The Gollancz Encyclopedia of SF Technology (Gollancz, 2006)

Audiobooks

 The Pyralis Effect (Doctor Who: The Companion Chronicles) (Big Finish, 2010)
 The Shattered Teacup (Newbury and Hobbes) (Snowbooks, 2010)
 Helion Rain (Warhammer 40000) (The Black Library, 2011)
 Child of Time (Time Hunter) (Fantom Films Limited, 2011)
 The Reification of Hans Gerber (Sherlock Holmes) (2011) 
 Labyrinth of Sorrows (The Black Library, 2012)The Shattered Teacup was offered as a free download by Snowbooks, it has however since been removed from their website

As editor

 The Solaris Book of New Science Fiction (Solaris, 2007)
 The Solaris Book of New Science Fiction, Volume Two (Solaris, 2008)
 The Solaris Book of New Science Fiction, Volume Three(Solaris, 2009)
 The Solaris Book of New Fantasy (Solaris, 2007)
 The Solaris Book of New Fantasy II (Solaris, 2009) 
 Sexton Blake: Detective (Snowbooks, 2009)
 Sexton Blake, Crime Fighter (Snowbooks, 2010)
 Encounters of Sherlock Holmes (Titan Books, 2013)
 Further Encounters of Sherlock Holmes'' (Titan Books, 2014)

References

External links

1978 births
Living people
Writers from Darlington
21st-century English novelists
English short story writers
English science fiction writers
Steampunk writers
English male short story writers
English male novelists
21st-century British short story writers
21st-century English male writers
Writers of Doctor Who novels